Louise  Giovanelli (born 1993) is a British painter.

Giovanelli received a Bachelor's degree from the Manchester School of Art in 2015, and completed postgraduate studies at the Städelschule in Frankfurt am Main in 2020.

Her work is included in the collections of the Manchester Art Gallery, the Akzo Nobel Art Foundation, Amsterdam  and the United Kingdom Government Art Collection.

References

Living people
1993 births
21st-century British painters
21st-century British women artists
Alumni of Manchester Metropolitan University